Giuseppe Mariani may refer to:

 Giuseppe Mariani (doctor) (18851963), Italian doctor and medical researcher
 Giuseppe Mariani (art director) (fl. 19521992), Italian art director